Bartoszcze is a Polish-language surname. It is a patronymic surname derived from the given name Bartosz. Notable people with this surname include:

Roman Bartoszcze (1946–2015), Polish agrarian politician
 (1961–2005),  brigadier general of Polish Air Force

References

Polish-language surnames
Patronymic surnames